Willem Vorsterman (died 1543) was an early printer of books, active in Antwerp between 1504 and 1543. He published about 400 books in Dutch, Spanish, English, Latin, French and Danish, making him the second most productive printer in the Netherlands in the first half of the 16th century, behind Hillenius. His earliest production, between 1500 and 1520, consisted mainly of works of fiction in Dutch often in chapbook format, while he later expanded into other languages and genres, with more luxurious, illustrated editions. He entered the Antwerp Guild of Saint Luke in 1512 and was its dean in 1527 and 1542. His shop was in the "Golden Unicorn", near the Kammerpoort in Antwerp.

Published works
1504: Amerigo Vespucci, Mundus Novus
1506: John Cassian, Dit is der ouder vader collasie
1511 or earlier: Den Herbarius in dyetsche, reprint of a work published by Johann Veldener in Leuven in 1484
1514: Bethlem, Een devote meditacie op die passie ons liefs Heeren Jesu Christi, reprinted numerous times until 1540
1515: Mariken van Nieumeghen
1515: Saint Jerome, anthology of his letters, partially reprinted in 1533
1516: Margarieta van Lymborch
1517: Die rechte conste om alderhande wateren te destilleeren
1518–1525: Elckerlijc
1520: Een seer ghenoechlike ende amoroeze historie vanden eedelen Lansloet ende die scone Sandrijn
1520: Den droefliken strijt van Roncevale
1521: William Lily, Libellus de constructione octo orationis partium ad codicem germanicum pluribus locis restitutus
1522: John Fisher, Convuslio calumniarum Ulrichi Veleni Minhoniensis
1523: Robert Sherwood, Ecclesiastes latine ad veritatem hebraicam recognitus
1527: Fasciculus mirre
1527: Een redelijck bewijs en verwinninghe der dolinghen
1528: Biblia a Dutch translation of the full Bible: also known are editions from 1530, 1532, 1533, 1534 and 1542. This translation was based on the work of Luther.
1528: Joannes Custos Brechtanus, Syntaxis Brechtana de integro nuper recognita
1528: Pronosticatie, Dit is een seer wonderlijcke prophecie (also exists in French, same year)
1529: Sebastian Virdung, Livre plaisant et très utile...
1529: Jacques Lefèvre d'Étaples, French translation of the Bible
1529–1531: a number of works in Danish by Christiern Pedersen, then exiled in the Low Countries
1530: Petrus Sylvius, Tfundament der medicinen ende chyrurgien (reprint 1540)
1531: Anthonis De Roovere, Die excellente cronicke van Vlaanderen
1533: Juan Luis Vives, Dutch translation of the De subventione pauperum
1536: Beatus Rhenanus, Vita Erasmi
1537: Bernard of Clairvaux, Een suyverlijck boecxken (reprinted 1540)
1538: La noble science des joueurs d'espée
1538: Historie vander coninghinnen Sibilla
1540: De verloren sone
1542: Nicolaus van Esch, Dye groote evangelische peerle vol devoter ghebede

Sources
Hilmar M. Pabel, Erasmus, Willem Vorsterman, and the Printing of St. Jerome's Letters, Quaerendo 37, 2007

Year of birth unknown
1543 deaths
Businesspeople from Antwerp
Flemish printers
Painters from Antwerp
Book publishers (people) of the Habsburg Netherlands